Arandon-Passins is a commune in the department of Isère, southeastern France. The municipality was established on 1 January 2017 by merger of the former communes of Passins (the seat) and Arandon.

See also 
Communes of the Isère department

References 

Communes of Isère